Economic Times may refer to:

 Hong Kong Economic Times (est. 1988), a Chinese-language financial newspaper
 The Economic Times (est. 1961), an Indian English-language financial newspaper
ET Chandigarh also known as The Economic Times Chandigarh (est. 2004)
 Weekly Economic Times (est. 1995), a Dhaka-based weekly newspaper in Bangladesh